= School for Islamic Youth =

Islamic school in Algeria

Information
- Other name: Shabiba school
- Established: 1922; 103 years ago
- Language: French; Arabic

The School for Islamic Youth (Madrasat al-Shabiba’l-Islamiyya), known as the Shabiba school, was one of the first and best-known progressive Islamic schools in Algeria.

It was officially registered in January 1922. The school was bilingual (French and Arabic) and aimed to promote a liberal and multicultural society. It was located in Algiers and from 1930 onwards the school occupied one building on the edge of the Casbah for boys, and one building in the Casbah itself for girls.
